Luo Lin (born April 6, 1979 in Guangzhou, Guangdong) is a female Chinese softball player who competed at the 2004 Summer Olympics.

In the 2004 Olympic softball competition she finished fourth with the Chinese team. She played four matches as outfielder.

External links
profile

1979 births
Living people
Chinese softball players
Olympic softball players of China
Sportspeople from Guangzhou
Softball players at the 2004 Summer Olympics